The 1909 Ursinus football team was an American football team that represented Ursinus College during the 1909 college football season. The team compiled a 6–1–1 record and outscored opponents by a total of 205 to 40. John B. Price was the head coach.

Schedule

References

Ursinus
Ursinus Bears football seasons
Ursinus football